Ormeau Hills is a residential locality in the City of Gold Coast, Queensland, Australia. In the  Ormeau Hills had a population of 3,148 people.

Geography
A small section of the eastern boundary of Ormeau Hills follows the Pacific Motorway.

The eastern part of the locality is a suburban development on lower flatter land ( above sea level).

History
The name of the locality comes from the neighbouring locality of Ormeau, which, in turn, takes its name from Ormeau House the estate of Major Alexander Jenyns Boyd, a sugar planter of the 1860s. His first wife, Isabella (née Dawson) was born at Ormeau Road, Belfast, Ulster, Ireland. The word ormeau is French, meaning young elm.

In the 2011 census, Ormeau Hills had a population of 1,212 people.

In the  Ormeau Hills had a population of 3,148 people.

Education
There are no schools in Ormeau HIlls. The nearest government primary school is Ormeau State School in neighbouring Pimpama to the east. The nearest government secondary school is Ormeau Woods State High School in neighbouring Ormeau to the north-east.

References

Suburbs of the Gold Coast, Queensland
Localities in Queensland